Calle Guanajuato is a park in Ashland, Oregon, United States.

Description and features
The park follows part of Ashland Creek and has restaurants with outdoor seating.

The park has an approximately 52-foot-long mural.

In 2017, the Mail Tribune Anita Burke said the park "[provides] the perfect convergence of creekside seating and restaurant variety".

References

External links

 
 Calle Guanajuato at the City of Ashland

Ashland, Oregon
Parks in Jackson County, Oregon